"Truth Be Told" is the eleventh episode of the first season of the American television drama series Dexter, which first aired on December 10, 2006 on Showtime in the United States. The episode was written by Drew Z. Greenberg and Tim Schlattmann, and was directed by Keith Gordon.

Plot
Rudy tracks down and kills the amputee prostitute who talked to Angel, leaving her dismembered remains in a public Christmas display. Dexter finds he is connected to the Ice Truck Killer, linking him to a bloody 1973 case that Harry investigated involving Dexter's biological mother. While researching newspaper articles from when he was a boy, he comes across the date of October 3, or 103, the number laced throughout the crime scene. Meanwhile, Captain Matthews has LaGuerta replaced for failing to find the Ice Truck Killer. Rita decides to take Astor and Cody to visit Paul in prison.

Rudy convinces Debra to join him on his rented boat where he proposes to her. However, he then reveals himself as the Ice Truck Killer and chokes her unconscious. Dexter begins to suspect Rudy due to Angel mentioning that he punched his attacker and finding out that there was a blood stain on his collar that was not consistent with his stab wound. Dexter takes a sample from the shirt and compares it to a blood sample from a piece of cotton wool in Rudy's trash, confirming the match. He tries to contact Debra to alert her of the danger she is in, but she is already tied up on Rudy's boat.

Reception
The episode received positive reviews from critics. Eric Goldman of IGN reviewed "Truth Be Told" warmly and gave the episode an "Amazing" rating of 9.2/10. TV Guide Paula Paige praised the episode: "Yowza! What is there to say about this show? 'So much,' is my response." Jonathan Toomey of TV Squad praised it saying "[t]his may very well have been a perfect hour of television."

References

External links

2006 American television episodes
Dexter (TV series) episodes
Television episodes directed by Keith Gordon